The 2004 Vuelta a España was the 59th edition of the Vuelta a España, one of cycling's Grand Tours. The Vuelta began in León, with a team time trial on 4 September, and Stage 12 occurred on 16 September with a stage from Almería. The race finished in Madrid on 26 September.

Stage 12
16 September 2004 — Almería to Calar Alto Observatory,

Stage 13
17 September 2004 — El Ejido to Málaga,

Stage 14
18 September 2004 — Málaga to Granada,

Stage 15
19 September 2004 — Granada to Sierra Nevada,  (ITT)

Stage 16
21 September 2004 — Olivenza to Cáceres,

Stage 17
22 September 2004 — Plasencia to La Covatilla,

Stage 18
23 September 2004 — Béjar to Ávila,

Stage 19
24 September 2004 — Ávila to Collado Villalba,

Stage 20

Stage 21
26 September 2004 — Madrid to Madrid,  (ITT)

References

2004 Vuelta a España
Vuelta a España stages